The 2020 FINA Marathon Swim World Series was scheduled to consist of 10 stops between 15 February to 24 October 2020. Due to the COVID-19 pandemic, only the first stop in Doha took place, and on 20 July, FINA confirmed that the remainder of the 2020 series had been cancelled.

Calendar

The calendar for the 2020 series was announced by FINA on 10 December 2019.

The Seychelles leg was scheduled to take place on 3 May, but was initially postponed until 18 August due to the COVID-19 pandemic.

On 20 July, it was confirmed that the remainder of the 2020 series had been cancelled.

Medal summary

Men

Women

Medal table

References

External links
Official website 

FINA Marathon Swim World Series
FINA Marathon Swim World Series
FINA